MatrixSSL is an open-source TLS/SSL implementation designed for custom applications in embedded hardware environments.

The MatrixSSL library contains a full cryptographic software module that includes industry-standard public key and symmetric key algorithms. It is now called the Inside Secure TLS Toolkit.

Features 
Features:
 Protocol versions
 SSL 3.0
 TLS 1.0
 TLS 1.1
 TLS 1.2
 TLS 1.3
 DTLS 1.0
 DTLS 1.2
 Public key algorithms
 RSA
 Elliptic curve cryptography
 Diffie–Hellman
 Symmetric key algorithms
 AES
 AES-GCM
 Triple DES
 ChaCha
 ARC4
 SEED
 Supported cipher suites
 TLS_AES_128_GCM_SHA256 (TLS 1.3)
 TLS_AES_256_GCM_SHA384 (TLS 1.3)
 TLS_CHACHA20_POLY1305_SHA256 (TLS 1.3)
 TLS_DHE_RSA_WITH_AES_128_CBC_SHA
 TLS_DHE_RSA_WITH_AES_256_CBC_SHA
 TLS_DHE_RSA_WITH_AES_128_CBC_SHA256
 TLS_DHE_RSA_WITH_AES_256_CBC_SHA256
 SSL_DHE_RSA_WITH_3DES_EDE_CBC_SHA
 TLS_RSA_WITH_SEED_CBC_SHA
 TLS_DHE_PSK_WITH_AES_128_CBC_SHA
 TLS_DHE_PSK_WITH_AES_256_CBC_SHA
 TLS_PSK_WITH_AES_128_CBC_SHA
 TLS_PSK_WITH_AES_256_CBC_SHA
 TLS_ECDHE_ECDSA_WITH_AES_128_CBC_SHA
 TLS_ECDHE_ECDSA_WITH_AES_256_CBC_SHA
 TLS_ECDHE_ECDSA_WITH_AES_128_GCM_SHA256
 TLS_ECDHE_ECDSA_WITH_AES_256_GCM_SHA384
 TLS_ECDHE_RSA_WITH_AES_128_CBC_SHA
 TLS_ECDHE_RSA_WITH_AES_256_CBC_SHA
 TLS_ECDHE_RSA_WITH_AES_128_CBC_SHA256
 TLS_ECDHE_RSA_WITH_AES_256_CBC_SHA256
 TLS_ECDHE_RSA_WITH_AES_128_GCM_SHA256
 TLS_ECDHE_RSA_WITH_AES_256_GCM_SHA384
 TLS_ECDH_ECDSA_WITH_AES_128_CBC_SHA
 TLS_ECDH_ECDSA_WITH_AES_256_CBC_SHA
 TLS_ECDH_RSA_WITH_AES_128_CBC_SHA
 TLS_ECDH_RSA_WITH_AES_256_CBC_SHA
 TLS_ECDH_ECDSA_WITH_AES_128_CBC_SHA256
 TLS_ECDHE_ECDSA_WITH_AES_128_CBC_SHA256
 TLS_RSA_WITH_AES_128_CBC_SHA
 TLS_RSA_WITH_AES_256_CBC_SHA
 TLS_RSA_WITH_AES_128_CBC_SHA256
 TLS_RSA_WITH_AES_256_CBC_SHA256
 TLS_RSA_WITH_AES_128_GCM_SHA256
 TLS_RSA_WITH_AES_256_GCM_SHA384
 SSL_RSA_WITH_3DES_EDE_CBC_SHA
 SSL_RSA_WITH_RC4_128_SHA
 SSL_RSA_WITH_RC4_128_MD5
 TLS_DH_anon_WITH_AES_128_CBC_SHA
 TLS_DH_anon_WITH_AES_256_CBC_SHA
 SSL_DH_anon_WITH_3DES_EDE_CBC_SHA
 SSL_DH_anon_WITH_RC4_128_MD5
 Client authentication
 Secure Renegotiation
 Standard Session Resumption
 Stateless Session Resumption
 Transport independent
 PKCS#1 and PKCS#8 key parsing
 False Start
 Max Fragment Length extension
 Optional PKCS#11 Crypto Interface

Major Releases

See also
Comparison of TLS implementations
GnuTLS
wolfSSL

External links 

 Inside Secure website

References 

Cryptographic software
C (programming language) libraries
Free security software
Transport Layer Security implementation